Lohača is a small village in the hills west of Planina in the Municipality of Postojna in the Inner Carniola region of Slovenia.

History
Lohača was administratively separated from Strmca in 1994 and made an independent settlement.

References

External links

Lohača on Geopedia

Populated places in the Municipality of Postojna